Edwin Earl Loucks  (September 15, 1896 – September 12, 1959) was a professional football player who spent one season in the National Football League with the Cleveland Bulldogs. He attended Washington & Jefferson College.

References

1896 births
1959 deaths
People from Westmoreland County, Pennsylvania
Players of American football from Pennsylvania
American football ends
Washington & Jefferson Presidents football players
Cleveland Bulldogs players